Cartridge World is a business specializing in managed print services, printer solutions, and ink and toner cartridges for domestic and commercial printers. The business model is to provide broad printing services to both home and businesses.

Company overview
Cartridge World uses a franchise model to license stores and spaces to provide printer and printing services that includes printer supplies, repair, monitoring, leasing, and consultation. There are more than 600 Cartridge World stores globally.

Cartridge World’s North American headquarter is located in McHenry, Illinois, while its global headquarters are in Australia.

The company was founded in 1992, by Bryan Stokes, as the "Australian Cartridge Company" in Adelaide, and changed the name to Cartridge World in 1999. The first store was enfranchised in 1997, and in August 2007, private equity fund Wolseley Private Equity purchased the business. In February 2001, the first Cartridge World in the United Kingdom was opened in Harrogate, North Yorkshire.

In June 2015, Cartridge World was acquired by Suzhou Goldengreen Technologies Ltd. In June 2016, Cartridge World Global CEO, Steve Weedon, announced a strategic partnership with Samsung, to offer mobile print and scanning services worldwide.

Mark Pinner was appointed as Global Chief Technical Officer and CEO of Cartridge World North America and Edwin Lui, previously General Manager Cartridge World Asia and Middle East, was also appointed as Global Chief Financial Officer.

In December 2019, Cartridge World North America completed a USA License deal with USA private equity firm, Blackford Capital Private Equity. A national private equity firm who make value adding investments in well established companies across a wide variety of industries.

In January 2020, Edwin Lui was promoted to the position of Global Chief Executive Officer of Cartridge World.Edwin has previously held multiple positions within Cartridge World including General Manager for Asia and Middle East and Global Chief Financial Officer.

References

Ink brands
Retail companies established in 1992